The Early Bird Spad 13 (also SPAD 13) is an American homebuilt aircraft that was designed and produced by the Early Bird Aircraft Company of Erie, Colorado. When it was available the aircraft was supplied as a kit and also in the form of plans for amateur construction.

Design and development
The Spad 13 is an 80% scale replica of the First World War SPAD S.XIII. It features a strut-braced biplane layout, a single-seat open cockpit, fixed conventional landing gear and a single engine in tractor configuration.

The aircraft is made from a mix of steel and aluminum tubing, with some wooden parts and its flying surfaces are covered with doped aircraft fabric.

The supplied kit included the Tracker engine. The manufacturer estimated the construction time from the kit to be 600 hours.

Operational history
By 1998 the company reported that 35 kits had been sold and one aircraft was flying.

Specifications (Spad 13)

References

Spad 13
1990s United States sport aircraft
1990s United States ultralight aircraft
Single-engined tractor aircraft
Biplanes
Homebuilt aircraft
Replica aircraft